The 2012 McNeese State Cowboys football team represented McNeese State University in the 2012 NCAA Division I FCS football season. The Cowboys were led by seventh-year head coach Matt Viator and played their home games at Cowboy Stadium. They are a member of the Southland Conference. They finished the season 7–4, 4–3 in Southland play to finish in a tie for fourth place.

Media
All McNeese State games will be broadcast on Gator 99.5 FM. KVHP 30.2 is the local affiliate for SLC TV and will air McNeese State games on SLC TV.

Schedule

Game summaries

Middle Tennessee
 
Sources:

After Texas A&M bought out the 2012 game scheduled against McNeese State, the Cowboys were able to find a replacement to open the season in the form of the Blue Raiders. It will be the first ever meeting between the two schools.

McMurry

The Cowboys look to get rid of a goose egg when they meet the D2 Independent War Hawks. McMurry and McNeese State have met twice before, in 1957 and 1958, with the War Hawks owning a 2–0 record against the Cowboys.

Sources:

Weber State

The Cowboys and Wildcats meet for the third time in 2012 with the series even at 1–1, the last having taken place in 1990 with Weber prevailing 27–7. The Wildcats will head to Lake Charles in 2013 as part of this home-and-home series.

Sources:

Southeastern Louisiana

SLC play begins with this match against the Lions. The Cowboys currently own a 22–15 record against the Lions.

Sources:

Northwestern State

SLC play continues when the Demons and Cowboys meet with the Cowboys owning a 40–20–1 record against Northwestern State.

Sources:

Central Arkansas

Central Arkansas heads to Cowboy Stadium in 2012. The Cowboys are 3–3 against the Bears.

Sources:

Sam Houston State

The defending conference champions appear near the end of November. The Cowboys own a 24–8–1 record against Sam Houston State, but the Bearkats have won the recent games.

Sources:

Stephen F. Austin

An attempt to pull further away from the Lumberjacks takes place in this 2012 contest. The Cowboys own a 16–13–2 record against the Lumberjacks.

Sources:

Nicholls State

The Cowboys open November with the Colonels. It's the 37th meeting with the Cowboys owning a 25–11 advantage in the series.

Sources:

UTSA

The Roadrunners stand as the final non-conference team until playoff time comes for the Cowboys in 2012. It's the second meeting between the 2 with McNeese having won the 2011 match.

Sources:

Lamar

The 31st meeting between the Cardinals and Cowboys closes the 2012 SLC season. The Cowboys own a 21–8–1 record against the Cardinals.

Sources:

Ranking movements

References

McNeese State
McNeese Cowboys football seasons
McNeese State Cowboys football